Roger Hauck (born October 8, 1961) is an American politician who has served in the Michigan Senate from the 34th district since 2023.   Roger grew up on a beef and dairy farm and graduated from Beal City High School. He then attended Central Michigan University before starting a 24-year career at the Delfield Company. He also co-owns a small building company.

Prior to serving as state representative, Hauck was elected to serve as a Union Township Trustee.

Hauck was elected in 2016 to the Michigan House of Representatives, and reelected in 2018 and 2020. 

Hauck was elected in 2022 to represent Michigan's 34th district in the Michigan Senate. Hauck currently serves as minority vice chair of the Senate Regulatory Affairs Committee and as a member of Health Policy, and Energy & Environment committees.

Electoral history

References

1961 births
Living people
Republican Party members of the Michigan House of Representatives
Republican Party Michigan state senators
People from Isabella County, Michigan
21st-century American politicians